Rosa Andreína Rodríguez Pargas (born 2 July 1986 in Acarigua, Portuguesa) is a Venezuelan hammer thrower. She is the Venezuelan record holder for the event with her personal best of 72.83 metres, set in May 2012, which she improved to 73.64 in 2013. Rodríguez represented Venezuela at the World Championships in Athletics in 2007, 2009, 2013 and 2015.

A former South American hammer champion at youth and junior levels, she won her first major medal at the South American Championships in 2005. She is a two-time Ibero-American gold medallist (2008, 2012) and two-time runner-up at the Central American and Caribbean Championships (2009, 2011). She competed at the 2011 Pan American Games and has also won medals at the Central American and Caribbean Games and Military World Games.

Career
As a youth Rodríguez competed in a variety of throwing events. At the 2001 World Youth Championships in Athletics she was a finalist in the shot put. The 2002 South American Youth Championships saw her win both the discus throw and hammer throw events, as well as a bronze medal in the shot put. She was a hammer finalist at the World Youth Championships, but was knocked out in qualifying at the 2004 World Junior Championships. She was crowned the South American Junior hammer champion in 2005.

In 2005, she won her first senior medal at the South American Championships in Cali, taking the bronze in the hammer. Later that year she set a South American junior record of 61.73 m in the event, while taking second place at the 2005 Bolivarian Games, and ended the year by improving this mark to 62.85 m. She broke the Venezuelan senior record in 2006 with a throw of 64.22 m in Barquisimeto. Her sole international medal that year came at the South American Under-23 Championships, where she came third behind Jennifer Dahlgren and Johana Moreno. She improved further in 2007, throwing the hammer 66.96 m in July. She was a silver medallist at the 2007 ALBA Games and represented Venezuela at the 2007 World Championships for the first time, competing in the qualifying round.

Rodríguez did not achieve the Olympic "B" standard of 67 metres in 2008 and missed the 2008 Beijing Olympics as a result. She was successful in regional competition, however, winning the titles at the Ibero-American and South American Under-23 Championships, as well as fifth place at the 2008 CAC Championships.

She missed out on the medals at the 2009 South American Championships, finishing fourth, but rebounded with a national record of 69.06 m at the 2009 CAC Championships to take second behind Arasay Thondike. She bettered that mark at the Bogotá leg of the South American Athletics Grand Prix, winning with 69.46 m. Returning to the world stage, she was eliminated in the qualification at the 2009 World Championships. That November she won shot put and hammer medals at the 2009 Bolivarian Games. Her 2010 season was highlighted by a bronze medal at the Ibero-American Championships, a silver medal at the 2010 Central American and Caribbean Games, and a year's best throw of 69.10 m to win the national title.

Rodríguez competed in many international events for Venezuela in 2011. She won her first continental medal since 2005 at the South American Championships, taking third place. She was runner-up at the 2011 CAC Championships, repeating her feat from 2009 and finishing behind Johana Moreno. She was a bronze medallist at the Military World Games held in Rio de Janeiro, won at the 2011 ALBA Games, and was eighth in the final at the Pan American Games. She began 2012 in top form and in May she improved her personal best to 72.83 m at a meeting in Croatia. A month later, the 2012 Ibero-American Championships in Athletics was hosted in her home town and she responded by winning the title in a championship record of 71.76 m.

Personal bests
Shot put: 15.07 m –  Barquisimeto, 14 May 2011
Discus throw: 44.63 m –  Barquisimeto, 14 December 2011
Hammer throw: 73.64 m –  Barquisimeto, 16 May 2013

International competitions

References

External links 
 
 

1986 births
Living people
People from Acarigua
Venezuelan female hammer throwers
Venezuelan female shot putters
Olympic athletes of Venezuela
Athletes (track and field) at the 2012 Summer Olympics
Athletes (track and field) at the 2016 Summer Olympics
Athletes (track and field) at the 2020 Summer Olympics
Pan American Games gold medalists for Venezuela
Pan American Games bronze medalists for Venezuela
Pan American Games medalists in athletics (track and field)
Athletes (track and field) at the 2011 Pan American Games
Athletes (track and field) at the 2015 Pan American Games
Athletes (track and field) at the 2019 Pan American Games
Medalists at the 2015 Pan American Games
Medalists at the 2019 Pan American Games
World Athletics Championships athletes for Venezuela
South American Games gold medalists for Venezuela
South American Games silver medalists for Venezuela
South American Games bronze medalists for Venezuela
South American Games medalists in athletics
Competitors at the 2014 South American Games
Athletes (track and field) at the 2018 South American Games
Athletes (track and field) at the 2022 South American Games
Central American and Caribbean Games gold medalists for Venezuela
Central American and Caribbean Games silver medalists for Venezuela
Central American and Caribbean Games medalists in athletics
Competitors at the 2010 Central American and Caribbean Games